Epworth United Methodist Church, originally Epworth Methodist Episcopal Church, is a historic Methodist church located at Norfolk, Virginia. It was designed by two noted Virginia architects James Edwin Ruthven Carpenter, Jr. (1867-1932) and John Kevan Peebles (1876-1934), and built between 1894 and 1896.  It is a rusticated granite with yellow sandstone trim church building in the Richardsonian Romanesque style. The original building is divided into three sections: the cruciform sanctuary, the social hall and classrooms, and the pastor's study.  The building features 22 beautiful stained glass windows, most notably the Ascension flanked by two Tiffany windows.  It has a bell tower topped by a pyramidal red tile roof.  The church was remodeled to its present appearance in 1921.

It was listed on the National Register of Historic Places in 1997.

References

External links
Epworth United Methodist Church website

19th-century Methodist church buildings in the United States
Methodist churches in Virginia
Churches on the National Register of Historic Places in Virginia
Romanesque Revival church buildings in Virginia
Churches completed in 1896
Churches in Norfolk, Virginia
National Register of Historic Places in Norfolk, Virginia